Sing the Night Away is a 5 track EP (plus the Bonus Track) by New Zealand punk band Steriogram. It was released at concerts during the 2002 NZ Schools Tour. A music video was made for the song "Sing The Night Away" although none of these tracks made their debut album Schmack!. "Sing the Night Away", "Free", and "Big Lady Loving" featured on singles from the album Schmack!, and "White Trash (DLT remix)" features on the Schmack! 2005 Special Tour Edition. West Side! is the only song not to feature on another album or single.

Track listing
 "Sing the Night Away"
 "Free"
 "Big Lady Loving"
 "White Trash (DLT remix)"
 "West Side!"

Personnel
 Tyson Kennedy – lead vocals
 Brad Carter – co-lead vocals and lead guitar
 Tim Youngson – rhythm guitar and backing vocals
 Jake Adams – bass guitar and backing vocals
 Jared Wrennall – drum kit and backing vocals

References

Steriogram EPs
1999 EPs